Doru Claudiu Buican (born 17 June 1982 in Romania) is a Romanian football defender who plays for the Romanian Liga I team CSU Voinţa Sibiu.

Career
In July 2006, he was transferred to UTA Arad, in the Romanian first division. However, he never appeared in the Arad line-up until the next season, when UTA was relegated. He played for the Arad outfit for the first half of the season 2008–09 in Liga II, but in February 2009 he became free agent because UTA did not paid his wages and subsequently signed with the Liga I club Gaz Metan Mediaş. In August 2009, he was loaned back to his old club UTA Arad for the 2009–2010 season.

References

External links
 
 

Romanian footballers
1982 births
Living people
CSU Voința Sibiu players
Association football defenders
Sportspeople from Sibiu